C.G. Hallberg was a prominent Swedish goldsmiths and jewelers, jeweler to the Swedish Court. Its central store was located at Drottninggatan 6 in Stockholm . It is best known for its silverware and metalware which continue to fetch high prices in auctions today. In the early 20th century it was the largest jewelers in Scandinavia and one of Sweden's top firms; by 1961 it was still the largest jewelers in Sweden with 31 domestic shops and a global export network. Jean Jahnsson was president from 1896. It merged with GAB in 1961.

References

Swedish jewellers
Silversmiths
Defunct companies of Sweden